Willie Gay (January 25, 1909 – September 4, 1970) was an American Negro league outfielder in the 1920s.

A native of Fort Gaines, Georgia, Gay was the brother of fellow Negro leaguer Herbert Gay. He played for the Chicago American Giants alongside his brother in 1929. Gay died in 1970 at age 61.

References

External links
 and Seamheads

1909 births
1970 deaths
Chicago American Giants players
Baseball outfielders
Baseball players from Georgia (U.S. state)
People from Fort Gaines, Georgia
20th-century African-American sportspeople
Burials at Long Island National Cemetery